This is a list of flags by color. Each section below contains any flag that has any amount of the color listed for that section.

Black (Sable) 

Black flag
Flag of the Aboriginals
Flag of Afghanistan
Agender pride flag
Flag of Albania
Civil Ensign of Albania
Naval Ensign of Albania
Flag of Alphen aan den Rijn
Flag of Amapá
Flag of Amsterdam
Flag of Angola
Flag of Antigua and Barbuda
Asexual pride flag
Flag of Arkhangelsk Oblast
Flag of the Armenian Apostolic Church
Aromantic pride flag
Flag of the Chief of Navy of Australia
State Flag of Austria
Flag of the Bahamas
Civil Ensign of the Bahamas
Naval Ensign of the Bahamas
Flag of Barbados
Naval Ensign of Barbados
Flag of Basel-Stadt
Flag of Belgium
Civil Flag and Ensign of Belgium
State Ensign of Belgium
Army Flag of Belgium
Naval Ensign of Belgium
Air Force Ensign of Belgium
Royal Standard of Belgium
Flag of Belize
Flag of Berlin
Flag of Bhutan
Flag of Bolivia
Flag of Botswana
Flag of Brittany
Flag of Brunei
Flag of Buckinghamshire
Flag of the Joint Forces of Canada
Flag of the Canadian Land Forces Command
Flag of the Navy Board of Canada
Flag of the Royal Canadian Sea Cadets
Flag of the Navy League Cadets of Canada
Flag of Cornwall
Flag of Corsica
Flag of Costa Rica
Flag of Croatia
Civil and State Ensign of Croatia
Naval Ensign of Croatia
Demiromantic pride flag
Demisexual pride flag
Flag of Devon
Flag of Dominica
Flag of East Timor
Flag of Egypt
Army Flag of Egypt
Naval Ensign of Egypt
Naval Jack of Egypt
Air Force Ensign of Egypt
Flag of El Salvador
Civil Ensign of El Salvador
Flag of Equatorial Guinea
Presidential Flag of Eritrea
Flag of Estonia
Presidential Flag of Estonia
Naval Ensign of Estonia
Naval Jack of Estonia
Flag of Eswatini
Flag of Falkland Islands
Flag of Fiji
Civil Ensign of Fiji
State Ensign of Fiji
Naval Ensign of Fiji
Civil Air Ensign of Fiji
Flag of Flanders
Flag of Fribourg
Genderfluid pride flag
Flag of Germany
State Flag of Germany
Naval Ensign of Germany
Presidential Standard of Germany
Flag of Ghana
Civil Ensign of Ghana
Flag of Gibraltar
Flag of Guatemala
Civil Flag and Ensign of Guatemala
Flag of Guinea-Bissau
Flag of Guyana
Flag of Haiti
Flag of Islamic Khilafah
Flag of Isle of Man
Flag of Jamaica
Flag of Jersey
Flag of Jihad
The Jolly Roger
Flag of Jordan
Flag of Kenya
Flag of Kuwait
Flag of Lesotho
Flag of Libya
Flag of Liechtenstein
Flag of the City of Madrid
Flag of Malawi
Flag of Malta
Flag of Maranhão
Flag of Maryland
Flag of Mexico
Flag of Montserrat
Flag of Moresnet
Flag of Mozambique
 Flag of Nazi Germany (1933-1945)
Flag of New Brunswick
Flag of Nicaragua
Nonbinary pride flag
Flag of Norfolk
Flag of North Carolina
Flag of the Northern Mariana Islands
Flag of the Northern Territory (Australia)
Olympic Flag
Palestinian flag
Flag of Papua New Guinea
Flag of Paraguay
Flag of Paraíba
Flag of Pennsylvania
Flag of Pitcairn Islands
Flag of Pittsburgh
Polyamory pride flag (the version created by Jim Evans in 1995)
Flag of Portugal
Flag of Prussia
Flag of Saint Helena
Flag of Saint Kitts and Nevis
Flag of Saint Lucia
Flag of San Marino
Flag of São Paulo (state)
Flag of São Tomé and Príncipe
Principality of Sealand
Flag of South Africa
Flag of South Korea
Flag of South Sudan
Flag of Spain
Flag of Sudan
Flag of Syria
Flag of Tanzania
Flag of Trinidad and Tobago
Flag of the Torres Strait Islands
Flag of Turkmenistan
Flag of Turks and Caicos Islands
Flag of Udmurtia
Flag of Uganda
Flag of the United Arab Emirates
Flag of Vanuatu
Flag of Vatican City
Flag of Venezuela
Flag of British Virgin Islands
Flag of United States Virgin Islands
Flag of Wales
Flag of Washington
Flag of Western Australia
Flag of Yemen
Flag of Zambia
Flag of Zimbabwe

Brown (Tenné)

Flag of American Samoa
Flag of Andorra
Flag of Argentina
Flag of Ayeyarwady Division, Myanmar
Flag of Belize
Flag of California
Flag of Chimbote, Peru
Flag of Chuvashia
Flag of Costa Rica
Flag of Dominica
Flag of Ecuador
Flag of Equatorial Guinea
Flag of Fiji
Civil Ensign of Fiji
State Ensign of Fiji
Naval Ensign of Fiji
Civil Air Ensign of Fiji
Flag of Guatemala
Flag of Hertfordshire
Flag and seal of Illinois
Flag of Iowa
Flag of Maine
Flag of Maine (1901–1909)
Flag of Mexico
Flag of Michigan
Flag of Missouri
Flag of Moldova
Flag of Montana
Flag of North Dakota
Flag of the Northern Territory (Australia)
Flag of Peru
Philadelphia pride flag
Progress pride flag
Flag of the United States Navy
Flag of Uruguay
Flag of Utah
Flag of Vatican City
Flag of Vermont

Blue (Azure) 

Flag of Alagoas
Flag of the Åland Islands
Flag of Alaska
Flag of Alberta
Flag of Alexandria
Flag of Altai
Flag of Amapá
Flag of Amazonas (Brazilian state)
Flag of American Samoa
Flag of Amur Oblast
Flag of Andorra
Flag of Antigua and Barbuda
Flag of Argentina
Civil Flag and Ensign of Argentina
Naval Jack of Argentina
Flag of Arizona
Flag of Arkansas
Flag of Arkhangelsk Oblast
Flag of Armenia
Flag of Artigas Department
Flag of Ashmore and Cartier Islands
Flag of Astrakhan Oblast
Flag of Asturias
Flag of Australia
Civil Ensign of Australia
Naval Ensign of Australia
Air Force Ensign of Australia
Flag of the Chief of Navy of Australia
Civil Aviation Ensign of Australia
Flag of the Australian Capital Territory
Flag of Azerbaijan
Flag of the Azores
Air Ensign of Bangladesh
Flag of the Bahamas
Civil Ensign of the Bahamas
Naval Ensign of the Bahamas
Flag of Bahia
Flag of Barbados
Naval Ensign of Barbados
Flag of Bashkortostan
Flag of Bavaria
Air Force Ensign of Belgium
Flag of Belize
Bisexual pride flag
Flag of Bosnia and Herzegovina
Flag of Botswana
Flag of Brazil
Naval Jack of Brazil
Flag of British Columbia
Flag of Brussels
Buddhist flag
Flag of Buryatia
Flag of Cambodia
Royal Standard of Cambodia
Flag of the Joint Forces of Canada
Naval Jack of Canada
Flag of the Canadian Air Forces Command
Flag of the Navy Board of Canada
Flag of the Royal Canadian Sea Cadets
Flag of the Navy League of Canada
Flag of the Navy League Cadets of Canada
Flag of the Canary Islands
Flag of Cape Breton Island
Flag of Cape Verde
Flag of Ceará
Flag of the Central African Republic
Flag of Chad
Flag of Cheshire
Flag of Chile
Naval Jack of Chile
Flag of the Republic of China
Civil Ensign of the Republic of China
Army Flag of the Republic of China
Naval Jack of the Republic of China
Naval Ensign of the People's Republic of China
Air Force Flag of the People's Republic of China
Christian flag
Flag of Colombia
Flag of Colorado
Flag of the Community of Portuguese Language Countries
Flag of the Comoros
Flag of Connecticut
Flag of Costa Rica
Civil Flag and Ensign of Costa Rica
Flag of the Republic of Crete
Flag of Croatia
Civil and State Ensign of Croatia
Naval Ensign of Croatia
Flag of Cuba
Flag of the Czech Republic
Flag of Czechoslovakia
Flag of Dagestan
Flag of Delaware
Flag of the Democratic Republic of the Congo
Flag of Devil's Island
Flag of Djibouti
Flag of Ecuador
Naval Ensign of Egypt
Air Force Ensign of Egypt
Flag of El Salvador
Civil Ensign of El Salvador
Flag of Equatorial Guinea
Flag of Eritrea
Presidential Flag of Eritrea
Flag of Espírito Santo
Flag of Estonia
Presidential Flag of Estonia
Naval Ensign of Estonia
Naval Jack of Estonia
Flag of Ethiopia
Flag of Europe
Flag of the Faroe Islands
Flag of Finland
State Flag and Ensign of Finland
War Flag and Naval Ensign of Finland
Presidential Flag of Finland
Flag of Fiji
Civil Ensign of Fiji
State Ensign of Fiji
Naval Ensign of Fiji
Civil Air Ensign of Fiji
Flag of Florida (Uruguay department)
Flag of Florida (U.S. State)
Flag of France
Civil and Naval Ensign of France
Presidential Standard of France
Flag of Friesland
Flag of Gabon
Flag of Gagauzia
Flag of Galicia
Gay and Lesbian Kingdom of the Coral Sea Islands
Flag of the Gambia
Genderfluid pride flag
Flag of Georgia (U.S. state)
Flag of the Georgian Orthodox Church
Flag of Goiás
Flag of Greece
Naval Jack of Greece
Air Force Ensign of Greece
Presidential Flag of Greece
Flag of Guam
Flag of Guatemala
Flag of Haiti
Civil Flag and Ensign of Haiti
Flag of Hawaii
Flag of Hertfordshire
Flag of Honduras
State Flag of Hungary
Naval Ensign of Hungary
Flag of Iceland
Flag of Idaho
Flag of India
Flag of Indiana
Flag of Iowa
Presidential Standard of Ireland
Flag of Israel
Presidential Flag of Israel
Presidential Standard of Italy
Flag of Juneau, Alaska
Flag of the Jewish Autonomous Oblast
Flag of Kabardino-Balkaria
Flag of Kansas
Flag of Kalmykia
Flag of Karachay-Cherkessia
Flag of Karelia
Flag of Kazakhstan
Flag of Kentucky
Flag of Khakassia
Flag of Kiribati
Flag of Komi
Flag of Krasnoyarsk Krai
Flag of Lesotho
LGBTQ+ pride flag
Flag of Liberia
Flag of Liechtenstein
Flag of Louisiana
Flag of Luxembourg
Flag of Madeira
Flag of the City of Madrid
Flag of Maine
Flag of Malaysia
Flag of Manitoba
Flag of Maranhão
Flag of the Marshall Islands
Flag of Mari El
Flag of Martinique
Flag of Massachusetts
Flag of Mato Grosso
Flag of Mato Grosso do Sul
Flag of Mauritius
Flag of Mercosur
Flag of Mexico
Flag of Michigan
Flag of Minnesota
Flag of Mississippi
Flag of Missouri
Flag of Moldova
Republic of Molossia
Flag of Mongolia
Flag of Montana
Flag of Montevideo Department
Flag of Montgomery, Alabama
Flag of Mordovia
Flag of Moresnet
Flag of Moscow
Flag of Namibia
Flag of Nebraska
Flag of Nevada
Flag of New Brunswick
Flag of New Hampshire
Flag of New Jersey
Flag and coat of arms of New York
Flag of New York City
Flag of Niue
Flag of Nicaragua
Flag of the Netherlands
Royal Standard of the Netherlands
Flag of New South Wales
Flag of New York City
Flag of New Zealand
Civil Ensign of New Zealand
Naval Ensign of New Zealand
Air Force Ensign of New Zealand
Flag of Newfoundland and Labrador
Flag of North Carolina
Flag of North Dakota
Flag of North Korea
Flag of the Northern Mariana Islands
Flag of the Northwest Territories
Flag of Norway
Flag of Nova Scotia
Flag of Nunavut
Flag of Ohio
Flag of Oklahoma
Olympic Flag
Flag of Ontario
Flag of Oregon
Flag of the Orkney Islands
Flag of Panama
Pansexual pride flag
Flag of Pará
Flag of Paraguay
Paralympic Flag
Flag of Paraná (state)
Flag of Paris
Flag of Pennsylvania
Flag of Pernambuco
Flag of Peru
Flag of the Philippines
Flag of Piauí
Flag of Pocatello
Polyamory pride flag (the version created by Jim Evans in 1995)
Polyamory pride flag (the version created by Red Howell in 2022)
Flag of Portugal
Presidential Flag of Portugal
Flag of Puerto Rico
Flag of Quebec
Flag of Queensland
Flag of Rhode Island
Flag of Rio de Janeiro
Flag of Rio Grande do Norte
Flag of Romania
Socialist Republic of Romania
Flag of Rondônia
Flag of Roraima
Flag of Russia
Presidential Flag of Russia
Flag of Rwanda
Flag of Saint Lucia
Flag of Saint Vincent and the Grenadines
Flag of Sakha
Flag of Salt Lake City
Flag of Sami
Flag of San Marino
Flag of São Paulo (state)
Flag of Scotland
Flag of Serbia
Flag of Serbia and Montenegro
Flag of the Serbian Orthodox Church
Flag of Sergipe
Flag of Seychelles
Flag of the Shetland Islands
Flag of Sierra Leone
Sikh flag
Flag of Slovakia
Flag of Slovenia
Flag of Somalia
Flag of South Africa
Flag of South Carolina
Flag of South Australia
Flag of South Dakota
Flag of South Georgia and the South Sandwich Islands
Flag of South Korea
Presidential Standard of South Korea
Flag of South Sudan
Royal Standard of Spain
Flag of Suffolk
Flag of Surrey
Flag of Sussex
Flag of Sweden
Royal Standard of Sweden
Flag of the Republic of China (Taiwan)
Flag of Tanzania
Flag of Tasmania
Flag of Tennessee
Flag of Texas
Flag of Tibet
Flag of Tocantins
Flag of Tokelau
Royal Standard of Tonga
Flag of the Torres Strait Islands
Transgender pride flag
Flag of Tuva
Flag of Ukraine
Flag of the United Kingdom
Air Force Ensign of the United Kingdom
UK Blue Ensign
Naval Ensign of the United Kingdom
UK Red Ensign
Royal Standard of the United Kingdom
Flag of the United Nations
Flag of the United States
Flag of the United States Air Force
Flag of the United States Army
Flag of the United States Bureau of Navigation (in use 1884–1946)
Flag of the United States Bureau of Fisheries (in use 1903–1940)
Flag of the United States Commissioner of Fisheres (in use 1903–1940)
Flag of the United States Coast and Geodetic Survey (in use 1899–1970)
Flag of the United States Coast Guard
Flag of the United States Environmental Science Services Administration (in use 1965–1970)
Flag of the United States Fish and Wildlife Service
Flag of the United States National Oceanic and Atmospheric Administration
Flag of the United States Navy
Flag of Uruguay
Flag of Utah
Flag of Uzbekistan
Flag of Venezuela
Flag of Vermont
Flag of Victoria
Flag of Virginia
Flag of United States Virgin Islands
Ensign of the Vietnam People's Navy
Flag of Washington
Flag of West Virginia
Flag of Western Australia
Flag of Winnipeg
Flag of Wisconsin
Flag of Wyoming
Flag of Yorkshire
Flag of Yugoslavia
Flag of the Yukon Territory

Gold or Yellow (Or) 

Flag of the Aboriginals
Flag of Acre
Flag of Adygea
Flag of the Åland Islands
Flag of Alaska
Flag of Alberta
Flag of Alexandria
Flag of Amapá
Flag of American Samoa
Flag of Andorra
Flag of Angola
Flag of Antigua and Barbuda
Flag of Argentina
Naval Jack of Argentina
Flag of Arizona
Flag of the Armenian Apostolic Church
AroAce pride flag
Flag of Astrakhan Oblast
Flag of the Chief of Navy of Australia
Flag of the Australian Capital Territory
State Flag of Austria
Flag of the Azores
Flag of Bangladesh
Flag of the Bahamas
Civil Ensign of the Bahamas
Naval Ensign of the Bahamas
Flag of Barbados
Naval Ensign of Barbados
Flag of Barcelona
Flag of Bashkortostan
Presidential Standard of Belarus
Flag of Belgium
Civil Flag and Ensign of Belgium
State Ensign of Belgium
Army Flag of Belgium
Naval Ensign of Belgium
Air Force Ensign of Belgium
Royal Standard of Belgium
Flag of Belize
Flag of Benin
Flag of Bhutan
Flag of Bolivia
Flag of Bosnia and Herzegovina
Flag of Brazil
Flag of British Columbia
Flag of Brunei
Flag of Brussels
Flag of Buckinghamshire
Buddhist flag
Flag of Burkina Faso
Flag of Buryatia
Royal Standard of Cambodia
Flag of Cameroon
Flag of the Joint Forces of Canada
Flag of the Canadian Land Forces Command
Naval Jack of Canada
Flag of the Navy Board of Canada
Flag of the Royal Canadian Sea Cadets
Flag of the Navy League Cadets of Canada
Flag of the Canary Islands
Flag of Cape Breton Island
Flag of Cape Verde
Flag of Catalonia
Flag of Ceará
Flag of Cheshire
First Flag of Chile (1812-1814)
Flag of the Central African Republic
Flag of Chad
Flag of Chechnya
Flag of the Eastern Band of Cherokee Indians
Civil Ensign of the Republic of China
Flag of the People's Republic of China
Flag of the People's Liberation Forces of the People's Republic of China
Flag of the Ground Forces of the People's Republic of China
Naval Ensign of the People's Republic of China
Air Force Flag of the People's Republic of China
Flag of Chuvashia
Flag of Colombia
Flag of Colorado
Flag of the Comoros
Flag of Connecticut
Flag of Costa Rica
Flag of the Democratic Republic of the Congo
Flag of the Republic of the Congo
Flag of Croatia
Civil and State Ensign of Croatia
Naval Ensign of Croatia
Flag of Cyprus
Flag of Delaware
Flag of the Democratic Republic of the Congo
Flag of Dominica
Flag of Dorset
Flag of Ecuador
Flag of Egypt
Army Flag of Egypt
Naval Ensign of Egypt
Naval Jack of Egypt
Air Force Ensign of Egypt
Flag of El Salvador
Civil Ensign of El Salvador
Flag of Equatorial Guinea
Flag of Eritrea
Presidential Flag of Eritrea
Flag of Essex
Presidential Flag of Estonia
Naval Ensign of Estonia
Flag of Ethiopia
Flag of Europe
Flag of Federal District (Brazil)
Flag of Fiji
Civil Ensign of Fiji
State Ensign of Fiji
Naval Ensign of Fiji
Civil Air Ensign of Fiji
State Flag and Ensign of Finland
War Flag and Naval Ensign of Finland
Naval Jack of Finland
Presidential Flag of Finland
Flag of Flanders
Flag of Florida
Flag of Gabon
Gay and Lesbian Kingdom of the Coral Sea Islands
Flag of Georgia (U.S. state)
Flag of Germany
State Flag of Germany
Naval Ensign of Germany
Presidential Standard of Germany
Flag of Ghana
Civil Ensign of Ghana
Flag of Goiás
Presidential Flag of Greece
Flag of Grenada
Civil and State Ensign of Grenada
Naval Ensign of Grenada
Flag of Guam
Flag of Guatemala
Flag of Guinea
Flag of Guinea-Bissau
Flag of Guyana
Flag of Hezbollah
Flag of Haiti
Flag of Hertfordshire
State Flag of Hungary
Naval Ensign of Hungary
Flag of Idaho
Flag of Illinois
Flag of Indiana
Intersex pride flag
Flag of Iowa
Presidential Standard of Ireland
Presidential Standard of Italy
Flag of Jamaica
Imperial Standard of Japan
Flag of the Jewish Autonomous Oblast
Flag of Kalmykia
Flag of Kansas
Flag of Karachay-Cherkessia
Flag of Kazakhstan
Flag of Kentucky
Flag of Khakassia
Flag of Kiribati
Flag of Krasnoyarsk Krai
Flag of Kurdistan
Flag of Kyrgyzstan
Flag of Lancashire
LGBTQ+ pride flag
Flag of Lithuania
Flag of Los Angeles
Flag of Louisiana
Flag of Madeira
Flag of Maine
Flag of Mali
Flag of Manchukuo (1932-1945)
Flag of Maryland
Flag of Massachusetts
Flag of Mato Grosso
Flag of Mato Grosso do Sul
Flag of Mauritania
Flag of Mauritius
Flag of Michigan
Flag of Minnesota
Flag of Mississippi
Flag of Missouri
Flag of Mongolia
Flag of Montana
Flag of Moscow
Flag of Mozambique
Flag of Myanmar
Flag of Namibia
Flag of Nebraska
Flag of Nevada
Flag of New Brunswick
Flag and seal of New Hampshire
Coat of arms and flag of New Jersey
Flag of New Mexico
Flag of New South Wales
Flag of Newfoundland and Labrador
Flag and coat of arms of New York
Flag of Nicaragua
Flag of Niue
Nonbinary pride flag
Flag of Norfolk
Flag of North Carolina
Flag of North Dakota
Flag of North Macedonia
Flag of North Ossetia
Flag of the Northwest Territories
Flag of Northumberland
Royal Standard of Norway
Flag of Nova Scotia
Flag of Nunavut
Olympic Flag
Flag of Ontario
Flag of Oregon
Flag of the Orkney Islands
Pansexual pride flag
Flag of Paraguay
Flag of Pennsylvania
Flag of Pernambuco
Flag of the Philippines
Flag of Piauí
Presidential Flag of Poland
Polyamory pride flag (the version created by Jim Evans in 1995)
Polyamory pride flag (the version created by Red Howell in 2022)
Flag of Portugal
Presidential Flag of Portugal
Flag of Prince Edward Island
Flag of Queensland
Flag of Rhode Island
Flag of Rio Grande do Norte
Flag of Rio Grande do Sul
Flag of Romania
Socialist Republic of Romania
Flag of the City of Rome
Flag of Rondônia
Flag of Roraima
Presidential Flag of Russia
Flag of Rwanda
Flag of Saint Kitts and Nevis
Flag of Saint Lucia
Flag of Saint Petersburg
Flag of Saint Vincent and the Grenadines
Flag of Sami
Flag of São Paulo (state)
Flag of São Tomé and Príncipe
Flag of Saskatchewan
Flag of Senegal
Flag of the Serbian Orthodox Church
Flag of Sergipe
Flag of Seychelles
Flag of Somerset
Flag of South Africa
Flag of South Australia
Flag of South Dakota
Presidential Standard of South Korea
Flag of South Sudan
Flag of South Vietnam
Naval ensign of South Vietnam
Flag of the Soviet Union
Flag of Spain
Royal Standard of Spain
Flag of Stavropol Krai, Russia
Flag of Suffolk
Flag of Suriname
Flag of Surrey
Flag of Sussex
Flag of Sweden
Royal Standard of Sweden
Flag of Tanzania
Flag of Tavolara
Royal Standard of Thailand
Flag of Tibet
Flag of Tocantins
Flag of Togo
Flag of Tokelau
Royal Standard of Tonga
Presidential Flag of Turkey
Flag of Tuva
Flag of Uganda
Flag of Ukraine
Royal Standard of the United Kingdom
Flag of the United States Environmental Science Services Administration (in use 1965–1970)
Flag of United States Marines
Flag of the United States Navy
Flag of the United States Public Health Service
Flag of Uruguay
Flag of Utah
Flag of the Vatican City (prior to 1808)
Flag of Venezuela
Flag of Vermont
Flag of Victoria
Ensign of the Vietnam People's Navy
Flag and seal of Virginia
Flag of Wallonia
Flag of Washington (U.S. State)
Flag of Western Australia
Flag of the West Indies Federation
Flag of West Virginia
Flag of Winnipeg
Flag of Wisconsin
Flag of Yorkshire
Flag of Zimbabwe
 Gadsden Flag

Green (Vert)

Green flag
Flag of Acre
Flag of Adygea
Flag of Afghanistan
Flag of Alagoas
Flag of Algeria
Naval Ensign of Algeria
Flag of Amapá
Flag of the Arab League
Flag of Astrakhan Oblast
Flag of Azerbaijan
Flag of Bangladesh
Civil Ensign of Bangladesh
Naval Ensign of Bangladesh
Flag of Bashkortostan
Flag of the Basque Country
Flag of Belarus
Presidential Standard of Belarus
Flag of Belize
Flag of Benin
Flag of Bolivia
Flag of Brazil
Flag of British Indian Ocean Territory
Flag of Bulgaria
Flag of Burkina Faso
Flag of Burundi
Flag of California
Flag of Cameroon
Flag of the Joint Forces of Canada
Flag of Cape Breton Island
Flag of the Cayman Islands
Flag of Ceará
Flag of Central African Republic
Flag of Chechnya
Flag of the Ground Forces of the People's Republic of China
Flag of the Comoros
Flag of the Republic of the Congo
Flag of Connecticut
Flag of Costa Rica
Flag of Cyprus
Flag of Dagestan
Flag of Delaware
Flag of Devon
Flag of Djibouti
Flag of Dominica
Flag of Dominican Republic
Flag of Ecuador
Flag of Equatorial Guinea
Flag of El Salvador
Flag of Eritrea
Presidential Flag of Eritrea
Esperanto flag
Flag of Ethiopia
Flag of the Falkland Islands
Flag of Federal District (Brazil)
Flag of Fiji
Civil Ensign of Fiji
State Ensign of Fiji
Naval Ensign of Fiji
Civil Air Ensign of Fiji
Flag of Florida
Flag of Gabon
Flag of the Gambia
Gay and Lesbian Kingdom of the Coral Sea Islands
Flag of Ghana
Civil Ensign of Ghana
Flag of Goiás
Flag of Grenada
Civil and State Ensign of Grenada
Naval Ensign of Grenada
Flag of Guam
Flag of Guatemala
Flag of Guinea
Flag of Guinea-Bissau
Flag of Guyana
Flag of Haiti
Flag of Hezbollah
Flag of Hungary
State Flag of Hungary
Naval Ensign of Hungary
Flag of India
Flag of Ingushetia
Flag of Iran
Flag of Iraq
Flag of Ireland
Flag of Italy
Presidential Standard of Italy
Flag of Ivory Coast
Flag of Jamaica
Flag of the Jewish Autonomous Oblast
Flag of Jordan
Flag of Kabardino-Balkaria
Flag of Kansas
Flag of Karachay-Cherkessia
Flag of Karelia
Flag of Kentucky
Flag of Kenya
Flag of Khakassia
Flag of Komi
Flag of Kurdistan
Flag of Kuwait
Flag of Lancashire
Flag of Lebanon
Flag of Lesotho
Flag of Libya
Flag of Lithuania
Flag of Los Angeles
Flag of Macau
Flag of Madagascar
Flag of the City of Madrid
Flag of Maine
Flag of Malawi
Flag of Maldives
Flag of Mali
Flag of Manitoba
Flag of Mato Grosso
Flag of Mato Grosso do Sul
Flag of Mauritania
Flag of Mauritius
Flag of Mexico
Flag of Missouri
Flag of Montana
Flag of Morocco
Republic of Molossia
Flag of Mozambique
Flag of Myanmar
Flag of Namibia
Flag of the canton of Neuchâtel
Flag of Nevada
Newfoundland Tricolour
Flag of New Hampshire
Flag and coat of arms of New York
Flag of Nicaragua
Flag of Niger
Flag of Nigeria
Flag of Norfolk Island
Flag of North Dakota
Flag of the Northern Mariana Islands
Flag of the Northwest Territories
Flag of Nottinghamshire
Flag of Oklahoma
Olympic Flag
Flag of Oman
Flag of Ontario
Flag of the Organisation of African Unity
Flag of Pakistan
Palestinian flag
Flag of Paraná (state)
Flag of Paraguay
Paralympic Flag
Flag of Peru
Flag of Piauí
Flag of the Pitcairn Islands
Flag of Portugal
Presidential Flag of Portugal
Flag of Prince Edward Island
Flag of Rio de Janeiro
Flag of Rio Grande do Norte
Flag of Rio Grande do Sul
Flag of Rondônia
Flag of Roraima
Flag of Rwanda
Flag of Saint Helena
Flag of Saint Kitts and Nevis
Flag of Saint Vincent and the Grenadines
Flag of Sakha
Flag of Sami
Flag of San Marino
Flag of Santa Catarina (state)
Flag of São Tomé and Príncipe
Flag of Saskatchewan
Flag of Saudi Arabia
Flag of Saxony
Flag of Senegal
Flag of Sergipe
Flag of Seychelles
Flag of Sierra Leone
Flag of the Solomon Islands
Flag of South Africa
Flag of South Sudan
Flag of Sri Lanka
Flag of the canton of St. Gallen
Flag of Sudan
Flag of Suriname
Flag of Syria
Flag of Tajikistan
Flag of Tanzania
Flag of Tatarstan
Flag of the canton of Thurgau
Flag of Togo
Flag of the Torres Strait Islands
Flag of Turkmenistan
Flag of Turks and Caicos Islands
Flag of the United Arab Emirates
Flag of Utah
Flag of Uzbekistan
Flag of Vanuatu
Flag of Venezuela
Flag of Vermont
Flag and seal of Virginia
Flag of British Virgin Islands
Flag of United States Virgin Islands
Flag of the canton of Vaud
Flag of Wales
Flag of Washington (state)
Flag of West Virginia
Flag of Yorkshire
Flag of the Yukon Territory
Flag of Zakynthos
Flag of Zambia
Flag of Zimbabwe

Maroon (Sanguine or Murrey) 

Flag of the Chief of Navy of Australia
Royal Standard of Belgium
Flag of the Joint Forces of Canada
Flag of the Navy Board of Canada
Flag of the Royal Canadian Sea Cadets
Flag of Latvia
Flag of Moscow
Flag of Qatar
Flag of the City of Rome 	
Flag of Sri Lanka
Flag of Georgia (1918-1932)

Orange (Orange)

Flag of Albany, New York
Flag of Alberta
Flag of Armenia
Flag of Ashkelon
Flag of Astrakhan Oblast
Flag of Bhutan
Flag of Bophuthatswana
Buddhist flag
Flag of the Chagossians
Flag of Cyprus
Flag of Delaware
Flag of El Salvador
Presidential Flag of Eritrea
Gay and Lesbian Kingdom of the Coral Sea Islands
Flag of Guatemala
Flag and seal of Illinois
Flag of India
Flag of Ireland
Flag of Ivory Coast
Flag of the Jewish Autonomous Oblast
Flag of Kfar Saba
Flag of the Marshall Islands
Flag of Nassau-Weilburg (1344-1816)
Royal Standard of the Netherlands
Flag of New Ireland Province
Flag of New York City
Flag of Nicaragua
Flag of Niger
Flag of Réunion (Proposed)
Flag of Rishon LeZion
Flag of the Orange Free State
Flag of San Jose, California
Sikh flag
Flag of South Africa (1928-1994)
Flag of Sri Lanka
Flag of Tierra del Fuego, Argentina 
Flag of Tocantins
Flag of Zakynthos
Flag of Zambia

Pink 
Bisexual flag
Espírito Santo
Flag of Spain
Flag of Mexico
Jalalabat
Newfoundland Tricolour
Pansexual flag
Transgender flag

Purple (Purpure) or Lilac 
Flag of the city of Ambolauri
Flag of the Municipality of Ambolauri
Flag of the Armenian Apostolic Church 
Asexual flag
Flag of the Balearic Islands
Flag of Belize
Bisexual pride flag
Flag of the Choctaw Nation
Flag of Connecticut
Flag of Dominica
Flag of Edmonton
Flag of El Salvador
Flag of Empire of Lehmark
Gay and Lesbian Kingdom of the Coral Sea Islands
Flag of the International Brigades
Flag of the Iroquois Confederacy
Flag of the Jewish Autonomous Oblast
Flag of Judicial Power and Supreme Court of the Dominican Republic
Flag of Málaga
Flag of the City of Madrid
Flag of Montreal
Flag of Nicaragua
Flag of the Ninotsminda municipality
Flag of the Northern Mariana Islands
Polyamory pride flag (the version created by Red Howell in 2022)
Flag of the Sagarejo municipality
Flag of Saskatoon
Flag of the Second Spanish Republic
Flag of Tokyo
Flag of the city of Vagharshapat
Flag and seal of Virginia
Flag of the city of Zugdidi
Flag of the Zugdidi municipality

Red (Gules) or Magenta

Red flag (disambiguation)
Flag of Acre
Australian Aboriginal Flag
Flag of Alabama
Flag of Alagoas
Flag of the Åland Islands
Flag of Albania
Civil Ensign of Albania
Naval Ensign of Albania
Flag of Alberta
Flag of Algeria
Naval Ensign of Algeria
Flag of Amazonas (Brazilian state)
Flag of American Samoa
Flag of Amsterdam
Flag of Amur Oblast
Flag of Andorra
Flag of Angola
Flag of Anguilla
Flag of Antigua and Barbuda
Flag of Arizona
Flag of Arkansas
Flag of Arkhangelsk Oblast
Flag of Armenia
Flag of Aruba
Flag of Astrakhan Oblast
Flag of Australia
Civil Ensign of Australia
Naval Ensign of Australia
Air Force Ensign of Australia
Civil Aviation Ensign of Australia
Flag of Austria
State Flag of Austria
Flag of Azerbaijan
Flag of Bangladesh
Civil Ensign of Bangladesh
Naval Ensign of Bangladesh
Civil Ensign of the Bahamas
Naval Ensign of the Bahamas
Flag of Bahia
Flag of Bahrain
Naval Ensign of Barbados
Flag of Barcelona
Flag of the Basque Country
Flag of Belarus
Presidential Standard of Belarus
Flag of Belgium
Civil Flag and Ensign of Belgium
State Ensign of Belgium
Army Flag of Belgium
Naval Ensign of Belgium
Air Force Ensign of Belgium
Flag of Belize
Flag of Benin
Flag of Berlin
Flag of Bermuda
Flag of Bolivia
Flag of British Columbia
Flag of British Indian Ocean Territory
Flag of Brunei
Flag of Buckinghamshire
Buddhist flag
Flag of Bulgaria
Flag of Burkina Faso
Flag of Burundi
Flag of California
Flag of Cambodia
Flag of Cameroon
Flag of Canada
Flag of the Joint Forces of Canada
Flag of the Canadian Land Forces Command
Naval Jack of Canada
Flag of the Canadian Air Forces Command
Flag of the Royal Canadian Sea Cadets
Flag of the Navy League of Canada
Flag of the Navy League Cadets of Canada
Flag of Cape Verde
Flag of Catalonia
Flag of Cayman Islands
Flag of Central African Republic
Flag of Chad
Flag of Chechnya
Flag of Chile
Flag of the Republic of China
Civil Ensign of the Republic of China
Army Flag of the Republic of China
Flag of the People's Republic of China
Flag of the People's Liberation Forces of the People's Republic of China
Flag of the Ground Forces of the People's Republic of China
Naval Ensign of the People's Republic of China
Air Force Flag of the People's Republic of China
Christian flag
Flag of Colombia
Flag of Colorado
Flag of the Comoros
Flag of Costa Rica
Flag of Cuba
Flag of the Democratic Republic of the Congo
Flag of the Republic of the Congo
Flag of the Cook Islands
Flag of Costa Rica
Civil Flag and Ensign of Costa Rica
Flag of the Republic of Crete
Flag of Croatia
Civil and State Ensign of Croatia
Naval Ensign of Croatia
Flag of Cuba
Flag of the Czech Republic
Flag of Dagestan
Flag of Delaware
Flag of Denmark
State Flag and Ensign of Denmark
Naval Ensign of Denmark
Royal Standard of Denmark
Flag of Djibouti
Flag of Dominica
Flag of Dominican Republic
Flag of Dorset
Flag of the Dutch Republic (1581-1795)
Flag of East Timor
Flag of Ecuador
Flag of Espírito Santo
Flag of Essex
Flag of Egypt
Army Flag of Egypt
Naval Ensign of Egypt
Naval Jack of Egypt
Air Force Ensign of Egypt
Flag of El Salvador
Civil Ensign of El Salvador
Flag of England
Flag of Equatorial Guinea
Flag of Eritrea
Presidential Flag of Eritrea
Presidential Flag of Estonia
Naval Ensign of Estonia
Flag of Ethiopia
Flag of the Falkland Islands
Flag of the Faroe Islands
Flag of Fiji
Civil Ensign of Fiji
State Ensign of Fiji
Naval Ensign of Fiji
Civil Air Ensign of Fiji
State Flag and Ensign of Finland
War Flag and Naval Ensign of Finland
Naval Jack of Finland
Presidential Flag of Finland
Flag of Flanders
Flag of Florida (USA state)
Flag of Florida (Uruguay department)
Flag of France
Civil and Naval Ensign of France
Presidential Standard of France
Flag of French Polynesia
Flag of Friesland
Flag of the Gambia
Gay and Lesbian Kingdom of the Coral Sea Islands
Flag of Georgia
Flag of Georgia (U.S. state)
Flag of the Georgian Orthodox Church
Flag of Germany
State Flag of Germany
Naval Ensign of Germany
Presidential Standard of Germany
Flag of Ghana
Civil Ensign of Ghana
Flag of Gibraltar
Flag of Greenland
Flag of Grenada
Civil and State Ensign of Grenada
Naval Ensign of Grenada
Flag of Guam
Flag of Guernsey
Flag of Guinea
Flag of Guinea-Bissau
Flag of Guyana
Flag of Hamburg
Flag of Haiti
Civil Flag and Ensign of Haiti
Flag of Hawaii
Flag of Hezbollah
Flag of Hong Kong
Flag of Hungary
State Flag of Hungary
Naval Ensign of Hungary
Flag of Iceland
Flag of Idaho
Flag of Illinois
Flag of Indonesia
Flag of Ingushetia
Flag of Iowa
Flag of Iran
Flag of Italy
Presidential Standard of Italy
Flag of Japan
Imperial Standard of Japan
Flag of Jersey
Flag of the Jewish Autonomous Oblast
Flag of Jordan
Flag of Karachay-Cherkessia
Flag of Karelia
Flag of Kenya
Flag of Kent
Flag of Khakassia
Flag of Kiribati
Flag of Krasnoyarsk Krai
Flag of Kurdistan
Flag of Kuwait
Flag of Kyrgyzstan
Flag of Lancashire
Flag of Laos
Flag of Lebanon
Flag of Leiden
Flag of Liberia
Flag of Libya
Flag of Liechtenstein
Flag of Lithuania
Flag of the City of London
Flag of Los Angeles
Flag of Louisiana
Flag of Luxembourg
Flag of Madagascar
Flag of Madeira
Flag of Maine
Flag of Malawi
Flag of Malaysia
Flag of Maldives
Flag of Mali
Flag of Malta
Flag of the Isle of Man
Flag of Manitoba
Flag of Maranhão
Flag of Maryland
Flag of Mauritania
Flag of Mauritius
Flag of Mexico
Flag of Michigan
Flag of Minas Gerais
Flag of Minnesota
Flag of Mississippi
Flag of Missouri
Flag of Moldova
Flag of Monaco
Flag of Mongolia
Flag of Montserrat
Flag of Mordovia
Flag of Morocco
Flag of Moscow
Flag of Mozambique
Flag of Myanmar
Flag of Namibia
 Flag of Nazi Germany (1933-1945)
Flag of Nepal
Flag of the Netherlands
Flag of Netherlands Antilles
Flag of New Brunswick
Flag of New Hampshire
Flag of New Jersey
Flag of New Mexico
Flag of New South Wales
Flag of New York
Flag of New Zealand
Civil Ensign of New Zealand
Naval Ensign of New Zealand
Air Force Ensign of New Zealand
Flag of Newfoundland and Labrador
Flag of Nicaragua
Flag of Niue
Flag of Nopis
Flag of North Carolina
Flag of North Dakota
Flag of North Korea
Flag of North Macedonia
Flag of North Ossetia
Flag of the Northern Mariana Islands
Flag of the Northwest Territories
Flag of Northumberland
Flag of Norway
Royal Standard of Norway
Flag of Nottinghamshire
Flag of Nova Scotia
Flag of Nunavut
Flag of Ohio
Olympic Flag
Flag of Oman
Flag of Ontario
Flag of the Orkney Islands
Palestinian flag
Flag of Panama
Flag of Papua New Guinea
Flag of Pará
Flag of Paraguay
Flag of Paraíba
Paralympic Flag
Flag of Paris
Flag of Pennsylvania
Flag of Pernambuco
Flag of Peru
Flag of the Philippines
Flag of Pitcairn Islands
Flag of Poland
Presidential Flag of Poland
Polyamory pride flag (the version created by Jim Evans in 1995)
Polyamory pride flag (the version created by Red Howell in 2022)
Flag of Portugal
Presidential Flag of Portugal
Flag of Prince Edward Island
Flag of Puerto Rico
Flag of Queensland
Flag of Rio Grande do Sul
Flag of Romania
Socialist Republic of Romania
Flag of Roraima
Flag of Russia
Presidential Flag of Russia
Flag of Sakha
Flag of Saint Helena
Flag of Saint Kitts and Nevis
Flag of Saint Petersburg
Flag of Sami
Flag of Samoa
Flag of San Marino
Flag of Santa Catarina (state)
Flag of São Paulo (state)
Flag of São Tomé and Príncipe
Flag of Saskatchewan
Principality of Sealand
Flag of Senegal
Flag of Serbia
Flag of Serbia and Montenegro
Flag of the Serbian Orthodox Church
Flag of Seychelles
Flag of Singapore
Flag of Slovakia
Flag of Slovenia
Flag of Somerset
Flag of South Africa
Flag of South Australia
Flag of South Georgia and the South Sandwich Islands
Flag of South Korea
Flag of South Sudan
Flag of South Vietnam
Flag of the Sovereign Military Order of Malta
Flag of the Soviet Union
Flag of Spain
Royal Standard of Spain
Flag of Sudan
Flag of the Sultanate of Muscat
Flag of Suriname
Flag of Switzerland
Flag of Syria
Flag of the Republic of China (Taiwan)
Flag of Tajikistan
Flag of Tasmania
Flag of Tatarstan
Flag of Tavolara Island
Flag of Tennessee
Flag of Texas
Flag of Thailand
Royal Standard of Thailand
Flag of Tibet
Flag of Togo
Flag of Tonga
Royal Standard of Tonga
Flag of Trinidad and Tobago
Flag of Tunisia
Flag of Turkey
Presidential Flag of Turkey
Flag of Turkmenistan
Flag of Turks and Caicos Islands
Flag of Tuvalu
Flag of Udmurtia
Flag of Uganda
Flag of the United Arab Emirates
Flag of the United Kingdom
Air Force Ensign of the United Kingdom
UK Blue Ensign
Naval Ensign of the United Kingdom
UK Red Ensign
Royal Standard of the United Kingdom
Flag of the United States
Flag of the United States Air Force
Flag of the United States Army
Flag of the United States Bureau of Navigation
Flag of the United States Bureau of Fisheries
Flag of the United States Coast and Geodetic Survey (in use 1899–1970)
Flag of the United States Coast Guard
Flag of the United States Environmental Science Services Administration (in use 1965–1970)
Flag of the United States Marine Corps
Flag of the United States National Oceanic and Atmospheric Administration
Flag of the United States Navy
Flag of Utah
Flag of Uzbekistan
Flag of Vanuatu
Flag of Vermont
Flag of Venezuela
Flag of Victoria
Flag of Vietnam
Flag of Virginia
Flag of the British Virgin Islands
Flag of the United States Virgin Islands
Flag of Wales
Flag of Wallonia
Flag of Western Australia
Flag of West Virginia
Flag of Wisconsin
Flag of Wyoming
Flag of the Yukon Territory
Flag of Zambia
Flag of Zimbabwe

White (Argent)

White flag
Flag of Afghanistan
Flag of Alabama
Flag of Alagoas
Naval Ensign of Albania
Flag of Alberta
Flag of Alderney
Flag of Alexandria
Flag of Algeria
Naval Ensign of Algeria
Flag of Alphen aan den Rijn
Flag of Altai
Flag of Amapá
Flag of Amazonas (Brazilian state)
Flag of American Samoa
Flag of Amsterdam
Flag of Amur Oblast
Flag of Andorra
Flag of Anguilla
Flag of Antarctica
Flag of Antigua and Barbuda
Flag of Arab League
Flag of Argentina
Civil Flag and Ensign of Argentina
Naval Jack of Argentina
Flag of Arkansas
Flag of Arkhangelsk Oblast
Flag of Aruba
Flag of the Association of Southeast Asian Nations
Flag of Astrakhan Oblast
Flag of Australia
Civil Ensign of Australia
Naval Ensign of Australia
Air Force Ensign of Australia
Civil Aviation Ensign of Australia
Flag of the Australian Capital Territory
Flag of Austria
State Flag of Austria
Flag of Azerbaijan
Flag of the Azores
Civil Ensign of the Bahamas
Naval Ensign of the Bahamas
Flag of Bahia
Flag of Bahrain
Naval Ensign of Bangladesh
Naval Ensign of Barbados
Flag of Barcelona
Flag of Bashkortostan
Flag of the Basque Country
Flag of Bavaria
Flag of Belarus
Presidential Standard of Belarus
Army Flag of Belgium
Naval Ensign of Belgium
Flag of Belize
Flag of Berlin
Flag of Bermuda
Flag of Bhutan
Flag of Bosnia and Herzegovina
Flag of Botswana
Flag of Brazil
Naval Jack of Brazil
Flag of British Antarctic Territory
Flag of British Columbia
Flag of British Indian Ocean Territory
Flag of the British Virgin Islands
Flag of Brittany
Flag of Brunei
Flag of Brussels
Flag of Buckinghamshire
Buddhist flag
Flag of Bulgaria
Flag of Burma
Flag of Burundi
Flag of Buryatia
Flag of California
Flag of Cambodia
Flag of Canada
Flag of the Canadian Land Forces Command
Naval Jack of Canada
Flag of the Canadian Air Forces Command
Flag of the Royal Canadian Sea Cadets
Flag of the Navy League of Canada
Flag of the Navy League Cadets of Canada
Flag of the Canary Islands
Flag of Cape Breton Island
Flag of Cape Verde
Flag of the Cayman Islands
Flag of Ceará
Flag of the Central African Republic
Flag of Chechnya
Flag of Chile
Naval Jack of Chile
Flag of the Republic of China
Civil Ensign of the Republic of China
Army Flag of the Republic of China
Naval Jack of the Republic of China
Naval Ensign of the People's Republic of China
Christian flag
Flag of Christmas Island
Flag of the Commonwealth of Independent States
Flag of the Cocos Islands
Flag of Colorado
Flag of the Community of Portuguese Language Countries
Flag of the Comoros
Flag of Connecticut
Flag of the Cook Islands
Flag of Cornwall
Flag of Corsica
Flag of Costa Rica
Civil Flag and Ensign of Costa Rica
Flag of the Republic of Crete
Flag of Croatia
Civil and State Ensign of Croatia
Naval Ensign of Croatia
Flag of Cuba
Flag of Cyprus
Flag of the Czech Republic
Flag of Delaware
Flag of Denmark
State Flag and Ensign of Denmark
Naval Ensign of Denmark
Royal Standard of Denmark
Flag of Devon
Flag of Djibouti
Flag of Dominica
Flag of the Dominican Republic
Flag of Dorset
Flag of Egypt
Army Flag of Egypt
Naval Ensign of Egypt
Naval Jack of Egypt
Air Force Ensign of Egypt
Flag of El Salvador
Flag of England
Flag of Equatorial Guinea
Presidential Flag of Eritrea
Esperanto flag
Flag of Espírito Santo
Flag of Essex
Flag of Estonia
Presidential Flag of Estonia
Naval Ensign of Estonia
Naval Jack of Estonia
Flag of Eswatini
Flag of the Falkland Islands
Flag of the Faroe Islands
Flag of Federal District (Brazil)
Flag of Fiji
Civil Ensign of Fiji
State Ensign of Fiji
Naval Ensign of Fiji
Civil Air Ensign of Fiji
Flag of Finland
State Flag and Ensign of Finland
War Flag and Naval Ensign of Finland
Naval Jack of Finland
Presidential Flag of Finland
Flag of Florida (Uruguay department)
Flag of Florida (USA state)
Flag of France
Civil and Naval Ensign of France
Presidential Standard of France
Flag of French Guiana
Flag of French Polynesia
Flag of the French Southern and Antarctic Lands
Flag of Friesland
Flag of Galicia
Flag of the Gambia
Flag of Georgia (country)
Flag of Georgia (U.S. state)
Flag of the Georgian Orthodox Church
State Flag of Germany
Naval Ensign of Germany
Flag of Gibraltar
Flag of Goiás
Flag of Greece
Naval Jack of Greece
Air Force Ensign of Greece
Presidential Flag of Greece
Flag of Greenland
Naval Ensign of Grenada
Flag of Guadeloupe
Flag of Guam
Flag of Guatemala
Civil Flag and Ensign of Guatemala
Flag of Guernsey
Flag of Guyana
Flag of Hamburg
Flag of Haiti
Flag of Hawaii
Flag of the Heard & McDonald Islands
Flag of Hertfordshire
Flag of Honduras
Flag of Hong Kong
Flag of Hungary
State Flag of Hungary
Naval Ensign of Hungary
Flag of Iceland
Flag of Idaho
Flag of Illinois
Flag of India
Flag of Indonesia
Flag of Ingushetia
Flag of Iowa
Flag of Iran
Flag of Iraq
Flag of Ireland
Presidential Standard of Ireland
Flag of the Islamic Conference
Flag of the Islamic Khilafah
Flag of the Isle of Man
Flag of Israel
Presidential Flag of Israel
Flag of Italy
Presidential Standard of Italy
Flag of Ivory Coast
Flag of Japan
Flag of Jersey
Flag of the Jewish Autonomous Oblast
Flag of Jihad
The Jolly Roger
Flag of Jordan
Flag of Kabardino-Balkaria
Flag of Kalmykia
Flag of Kansas
Flag of Karachay-Cherkessia
Flag of Kent
Flag of Kentucky
Flag of Kenya
Flag of Khakassia
Flag of Kiribati
Flag of Komi
Flag of Krasnoyarsk Krai
Flag of Kurdistan
Flag of Kuwait
Flag of Laos
Flag of Latvia
Flag of Lebanon
Flag of Leiden
Flag of Lesotho
Flag of Liberia
Flag of Libya
Flag of the City of London
Flag of Louisiana
Flag of Luxembourg
Flag of Macao
Flag of Madagascar
Flag of Madeira
Flag of the City of Madrid
Flag of Maine
Flag of Malaysia
Flag of Maldives
Flag of Malta
Flag of Manitoba
Flag of Maranhão
Flag of the Marshall Islands
Flag of Martinique
Flag of Mari El
Flag of Maryland
Flag of Massachusetts
Flag of Mato Grosso
Flag of Mato Grosso do Sul
Flag of Mayotte
Flag of Mexico
Flag of Michigan
Flag of Micronesia
Flag of the Midway Islands
Flag of Minas Gerais
Flag of Minnesota
Flag of Mississippi
Flag of Missouri
Republic of Molossia
Flag of Monaco
Flag of Montana
Flag of Montserrat
Flag of Mordovia
Flag of Moresnet
Flag of Mozambique
Flag of Myanmar
Flag of Namibia
Flag of the North Atlantic Treaty Organisation
Flag of Nauru
 Flag of Nazi Germany (1933-1945)
Flag of Nepal
Flag of the Netherlands
Flag of the Netherlands Antilles
Flag of Nevada
Flag of New Brunswick
Flag of New Hampshire
Flag of New Jersey
Flag of New South Wales
Flag of New York
Flag of New York City
Flag of New Zealand
Civil Ensign of New Zealand
Naval Ensign of New Zealand
Air Force Ensign of New Zealand
Flag of Newfoundland and Labrador
Newfoundland Tricolour
Flag of Nicaragua
Flag of Niger
Flag of Nigeria
Flag of Niue
Flag of the Nordic Council
Flag of Norfolk
Flag of Norfolk Island
Flag of North Carolina
Flag of North Dakota
Flag of North Korea
Flag of North Ossetia
Flag of Northern Cyprus
Flag of Northern Ireland
Flag of the Northern Mariana Islands
Flag of the Northern Territory (Australia)
Flag of the Northwest Territories
Flag of North Ossetia
Flag of Norway
Royal Standard of Norway
Flag of Nottinghamshire
Flag of Nova Scotia
Flag of Nunavut
Flag of Oecusse District, Timor Leste
Flag of Ohio
Flag of Oklahoma
Olympic Flag
Flag of Oman
Flag of Ontario
Flag of the Organization of American States
Flag of the Organization of African Unity
Flag of the Organization of Petroleum Exporting Countries
Flag of the Pacific Community
Flag of Pakistan
Palestinian flag
Flag of Panama
Flag of Papua New Guinea
Flag of Pará
Flag of Paraguay
Flag of Paraíba
Paralympic Flag
Flag of Paraná (state)
Flag of Pennsylvania
Flag of Pernambuco
Flag of Peru
Flag of the Philippines
Flag of Piauí
Flag of the Pitcairn Islands
Flag of Poland
Presidential Flag of Poland
Polyamory pride flag (the version created by Red Howell in 2022)
Flag of Portugal
Presidential Flag of Portugal
Flag of Prince Edward Island
Flag of Puerto Rico
Flag of Qatar
Flag of Quebec
Flag of Queensland
Flag of the Red Cross
Flag of Reunion
Flag of Rhode Island
Flag of Rio de Janeiro
Flag of Rio Grande do Norte
Flag of Rio Grande do Sul
Flag of Rondônia
Flag of Roraima
Flag of Russia
Presidential Flag of Russia
Flag of Saint Helena & Dependencies
Flag of Saint Kitts and Nevis
Flag of Saint Lucia
Flag of Saint Petersburg
Flag of Saint Pierre and Miquelon
Flag of Sakha
Flag of Salt Lake City
Flag of Samoa
Flag of San Marino
Flag of Santa Catarina (state)
Flag of São Paulo (state)
Flag of Sark
Flag of Saudi Arabia
Flag of Saxony
Flag of Scotland
Flag of Scouts & Guides
Flag of Seborga
Principality of Sealand
Flag of Serbia
Flag of Serbia and Montenegro
Flag of the Serbian Orthodox Church
Flag of Sergipe
Flag of Seychelles
Flag of the Shetland Islands
Flag of Sierra Leone
Flag of Singapore
Flag of Slovakia
Flag of Slovenia
Flag of surrender
Flag of the Soloman Islands
Flag of Somalia
Flag of Somaliland
Flag of South Africa
Flag of South Australia
Flag of South Carolina
Flag of South Dakota
Flag of South Georgia and the South Sandwich Islands
Flag of South Korea
Flag of South Sudan
Flag of the Sovereign Military Order of Malta
Royal Standard of Spain
Flag of The Sudan
Flag of Suriname
Flag of Switzerland
Flag of Syria
Flag of the Republic of China (Taiwan)
Flag of Tajikistan
Flag of Tasmania
Flag of Tatarstan
Flag of Tavolara
Flag of Tennessee
Flag of Texas
Flag of Thailand
Flag of Tibet
Flag of Timor-Leste
Flag of Tocantis
Flag of Togo
Flag of Tokelau
Flag of Tonga
Royal Standard of Tonga
Flag of the Torres Strait Islands
Flag of Trinidad & Tobago
Flag of Tristan da Cunha
Flag of Tromelin
Flag of Tunisia
Flag of Turkey
Presidential Flag of Turkey
Flag of Turkmenistan
Flag of the Turks & Caicos Islands
Flag of Tuva
Flag of Tuvalu
Flag of Udmurtia
Flag of Uganda
Flag of the United Arab Emirates
Flag of the United Kingdom
Air Force Ensign of the United Kingdom
UK Blue Ensign
Naval Ensign of the United Kingdom
UK Red Ensign
Royal Standard of the United Kingdom
Flag of the United Nations
Flag of the United States
Flag of the United States Air Force
Flag of the United States Army
Flag of the United States Bureau of Navigation
Flag of the United States Bureau of Fisheries
Flag of the United States Coast and Geodetic Survey (in use 1899–1970)
Flag of the United States Coast Guard
Flag of the United States Environmental Science Services Administration (in use 1965–1970)
Flag of the United States Fish and Wildlife Service
Flag of the United States National Oceanic and Atmospheric Administration
Flag of the United States Navy
Flag of the United States Marine Corps
Flag of Uruguay
Flag of Utah
Flag of Uzbekistan
Flag of Vatican City
Flag of Venezuela
Flag of Vermont
Flag of Victoria
Flag of the United States Virgin Islands
Flag of Virginia
Ensign of the Vietnam People's Navy
Flag of Wake Island
Flag of Wales
Flag of Wallis & Futuna
Flag of Washington
Flag of Washington, D.C.
Flag of West Virginia
Flag of Western Australia
Flag of the Western European Union
Flag of Winnipeg
Flag of Wisconsin
Flag of Wyoming
Flag of the Sahrawi Arab Democratic Republic
Flag of Yemen
Flag of Yorkshire
Flag of the Yukon Territory
Flag of Zimbabwe

Gray
Flag of Santiago Metropolitan Region
Flag of Coclé Province, Panama

See also
List of flags
List of flags by color combination
List of flags by number of colors

External links
Extensive list of similar flags from around the world
Interactively explore flags to see similarities in colors, symbols and patterns.

 Color
Color schemes